Sanaa Altama (born 23 July 1990) is a former professional footballer who played as a defensive midfielder. Born in France, he represented Chad at international level.

Career 
Born in Lille, Altama began his career with hometown club Lille. He did not make a professional appearance for the senior team, but did play on the club's reserve team in the Championnat de France Amateur, making over 40 appearances over two seasons before joining Dijon in 2010. In June 2010, Altama signed a professional contract with Dijon. He made his professional debut on 19 October 2010 in a 4–0 victory over Vannes.

Altama joined RWDM in the beginning of September 2018, but left the club again at the end of 2018.

References

External links 
 
 
 

1990 births
Living people
Footballers from Lille
Chadian footballers
Chad international footballers
French footballers
French sportspeople of Chadian descent
Black French sportspeople
Association football midfielders
Dijon FCO players
Royal Excel Mouscron players
ASC Oțelul Galați players
FC Petrolul Ploiești players
CS Sedan Ardennes players
LB Châteauroux players
Ligue 1 players
Ligue 2 players
Challenger Pro League players
Liga I players
French expatriate footballers
Expatriate footballers in Belgium
Expatriate footballers in Romania
Chadian expatriate footballers
Chadian expatriate sportspeople in Belgium
Chadian expatriate sportspeople in Romania
French expatriate sportspeople in Romania
French expatriate sportspeople in Belgium